Ethnikos Asteras Limassol was a Cypriot football club based in the area of Ayios Ioannis, Limassol. Founded in 1957, was playing sometimes in Second and in Third Division. After the start of 1977-78 the team withdrew from the league and from Cyprus Football Association.

Honours
 Cypriot Third Division:
 Champions (1): 1972

References

Defunct football clubs in Cyprus
Association football clubs established in 1957
1957 establishments in Cyprus